Jamie Fritsch (born February 25, 1985) is an American former professional ice hockey defenceman who last played for Braehead Clan, Scotland of the Elite Ice Hockey League (EIHL). He played in one National Hockey League (NHL) game with the Philadelphia Flyers during the 2008–09 season.

Playing career
Undrafted, he played collegiate hockey with the University of New Hampshire of the Hockey East. After completing his senior year in 2008–09, amassing 146 games with the Wildcats, he was signed by the Philadelphia Flyers on an amateur try-out contract on April 12, 2009. Signed because of the Flyers salary cap limitations, Fritsch made his NHL debut in the last regular season game against the New York Rangers on the same day. He became the second player to make it to the NHL who grew up in Maryland.

Jamie signed with the Gwinnett Gladiators of the ECHL for the 2009–10 season and played in 48 games posting 5 points. On February 5, 2010, he was signed to a try-out with the Norfolk Admirals of the AHL and appeared in 2 games. Following the season, he was traded to the Las Vegas Wranglers on August 12, 2010.

Fritsch signed his first European contract as a free agent with Italian club, Hockey Milano Rossoblu on August 20, 2013. After a single season in Italy, Fritsch continued abroad in signing a one-year contract with Scottish club, Braehead Clan of the EIHL on August 13, 2014.

Career statistics

See also
List of players who played only one game in the NHL

References

External links
 

1985 births
American men's ice hockey defensemen
Braehead Clan players
Bridgeport Sound Tigers players
Gwinnett Gladiators players
Houston Aeros (1994–2013) players
Ice hockey people from Maryland
Las Vegas Wranglers players
Living people
New Hampshire Wildcats men's ice hockey players
Norfolk Admirals players
People from Odenton, Maryland
Philadelphia Flyers players
Undrafted National Hockey League players
American expatriate ice hockey players in Italy
American expatriate ice hockey players in Scotland